Anders Otto Petersen  (16 December 1899 – 28 April 1966) was a Danish flyweight professional boxer who competed in the 1920s. Known as "Vidunderbarnet (Wonder kid)", he won a silver medal in Boxing at the 1920 Summer Olympics, losing to American Frankie Genaro in the final.

1920 Olympic results
Below are the results of Anders Pedersen, a Danish flyweight boxer, who competed at the 1920 Olympics in Antwerp:

 Round of 16: defeated Nelis van Dijk (Netherlands)
 Quarterfinal: defeated Peter Zivic (United States)
 Semifinal: defeated William Cuthbertson (Great Britain)
 Final: lost to Frankie Genaro (United States) -- was awarded silver medal

References

External links

1899 births
1966 deaths
Olympic boxers of Denmark
Flyweight boxers
Olympic silver medalists for Denmark
Boxers at the 1920 Summer Olympics
Place of birth missing
Olympic medalists in boxing
Danish male boxers
Medalists at the 1920 Summer Olympics